La Chapelle-aux-Bois is a commune in the Vosges department in Grand Est in northeastern France.

Geography
The Côney forms part of the commune's northwestern border.

See also
Communes of the Vosges department

References

Communes of Vosges (department)